Hermann Engelhard (21 June 1903 – 6 January 1984) was a German middle-distance runner who won a bronze medal in the 800 meters at the 1928 Summer Olympics in Amsterdam. He also helped the German team of Otto Neumann, Harry Werner Storz and Richard Krebs to win the silver medal in the 4 × 400 m relay.

Engelhard's brother Richard was an elite long-distance runner in the 1920s. In 1932 Engelhard married Ruth Becker, a German runner who set three world records in the 80 m hurdles and 4 × 200 m relay. Their son Bernd and daughter Petra also became short to middle-distance runners. After retiring from competitions Engelhard worked as an athletics coach in Württemberg and Hessen, along with his wife. He wrote books Leistungsschulung des Mittelstrecklers (How to coach middle distance runners, 1937) and Der Mittelstreckenlauf (Middle distance running, 1950).

References

1903 births
1984 deaths
German male middle-distance runners
German male sprinters
Athletes (track and field) at the 1928 Summer Olympics
Olympic athletes of Germany
Olympic silver medalists for Germany
Olympic bronze medalists for Germany
Sportspeople from Darmstadt
People from the Grand Duchy of Hesse

Medalists at the 1928 Summer Olympics
Olympic silver medalists in athletics (track and field)
Olympic bronze medalists in athletics (track and field)